1,4,7-Trimethyl-1,4,7-triazacyclononane is the aza-crown ether with the formula (CH2CH2NCH3)3.  This colorless liquid is the N-methylated derivative of triazacyclononane (TACN), a face-capping tridentate ligand that is popular in coordination chemistry.  

Although TACN is known for forming 2:1 "sandwich" complexes with many metal ions, corresponding 2:1 complexes of Me3TACN are only known for Ag+, Na+, and K+.  This effect is mainly due to the greater bulk of Me3TACN, which requires ions with a larger ionic radius to accommodate two ligands.  

Several related derivatives have been prepared with diverse substituents on nitrogen.

References

Polyamines
Chelating agents
Macrocycles
Heterocyclic compounds with 1 ring
Tertiary amines